Ōimachi may refer to:

 Tōkyū Ōimachi Line, a railway line between Kawasaki and Tokyo in Japan.
 Ōimachi Station, a station on the said railway line.